Marguerite Newburgh Cole was the first woman to vote in the United States under the 19th amendment, passed in 1919, which granted women the right to vote. Coming from Orange City, Iowa, she was a movie theater office manager, apartment complex manager, and central market cashier during her lifetime. She was also a volunteer for the Spastic Children's League of Los Angeles, California.

Personal life
Cole was born in 1897 to Louis Newburgh and Louisa Vandenberg. She was one of five children, along with Nellie, Leona, Ruth, and Eugene. She married Lyle William Cole in 1923, and had one child, Joanne, in 1929. Lyle died in 1972, and Joanne died in 2004.  Marguerite Cole died in 1987.

References

Women's suffrage in the United States
1897 births
Year of death missing